In botany, a hilum (pronounced ) is a scar or mark left on a seed coat by the former attachment to the ovary wall or to the funiculus (which in turn attaches to the ovary wall). On a bean seed, the hilum is called the "eye".

For some species of fungus, the hilum is the microscopic indentation left on a spore when it separates from the sterigma of the basidium.

A hilum can also be a nucleus of a starch grain; the point around which layers of starch are deposited.

The adjectival form hilar denotes the presence of such a mark, and can be used as a distinguishing characteristic of a seed or spore.

References

Plant anatomy
Fungal morphology and anatomy